The following is a list of notable deaths in May 2011.

Entries for each day are listed alphabetically by surname. A typical entry lists information in the following sequence:
 Name, age, country of citizenship at birth, subsequent country of citizenship (if applicable), reason for notability, cause of death (if known), and reference.

May 2011

1
Alex, 52, Indian actor and magician, brief illness.
Spyrydon Babskyi, 52, Ukrainian Orthodox hierarch, Archbishop of Vinnytsia in UOC-KP (1992–1993).
Schalk Booysen, 83, South African Olympic sprinter.
Sir Henry Cooper, 76, British Olympic heavyweight boxer.
Brian Evans, 74, Welsh cricketer (Glamorgan).
Agustín García-Gasco Vicente, 80, Spanish Roman Catholic cardinal, Archbishop of Valencia (1992–2009), cardiac arrest.
Moshe Landau, 99, Israeli jurist, Chief Justice (1980–1982), presided over Adolf Eichmann's trial (1961).
Ted Lowe, 90, British snooker commentator.
Steven Orszag, 68, American mathematician, chronic lymphomic leukemia.
Anny Rüegg, c. 99, Swiss alpine skier.
Ivan Slavkov, 70, Bulgarian sports official.
William O. Taylor II, 78, American journalist and publisher (The Boston Globe), brain tumor.
J. Ernest Wilkins, Jr., 87, American mathematician and nuclear scientist.

2
Leonid Abalkin, 80, Russian economist.
Abu Ahmed al-Kuwaiti, 46, Kuwaiti Al-Qaeda computer expert, shot.
L.V. Banks, 78, American guitarist, singer and songwriter, heart failure.
Ion Barbu, 72, Romanian football player.
Robert W. Clower, 85, American economist.
Lloyd Colteryahn, 79, American football player (Baltimore Colts).
Sir Basil Hall, 93, British lawyer and civil servant, Treasury Solicitor (1975–1980).
Danny Kassap, 28, Congolese-born Canadian long-distance runner.
Osama bin Laden, 54, Saudi founder of Al-Qaeda, planned September 11 attacks, shot.
Alexander Lazarev, 73, Russian actor.
Eddie Lewis, 76, English footballer (Manchester United, West Ham United), cancer.
Owen Roe McGovern, 93, Irish Gaelic football player.
Lyuben Obretenov, 92, Bulgarian Olympic gymnast.
René Emilio Ponce, 64, Salvadoran general and defence minister, army chief of staff during the Civil War.
David Sencer, 86, American public health official, director of Centers for Disease Control and Prevention (1966–1977), heart disease.
Shigeo Yaegashi, 78, Japanese footballer.

3
Paul Ackerley, 61, New Zealand hockey player and coach, skin cancer.
Frédéric Affo, 68, Beninese politician and football executive.
Robert Marshall Anderson, 77, American bishop, pancreatic cancer.
Victor Auer, 74, American Olympic silver medal-winning (1972) sports shooter.
Bob Balog, 86, American football player (Pittsburgh Steelers).
Robert Brout, 82, American-born Belgian theoretical physicist.
Odell Brown, 70, American jazz organist and songwriter ("Sexual Healing").
Jackie Cooper, 88, American actor (Skippy, Our Gang, Superman) and director (M*A*S*H).
C. Rollins Hanlon, 96, American cardiac surgeon, lymphoma.
Richie Hubbard, 78, Canadian politician.
Sergo Kotrikadze, 74, Georgian football player and coach, heart attack.
Abdulla Kurd, 34, Turkish Kurdish Islamist militant.
Mildred Robbins Leet, 88, American philanthropist, co-founder of Trickle Up, complications of a fall.
Larry McCormick, 71, Canadian politician, Member of Parliament for Hastings—Frontenac—Lennox and Addington (1993–2004).
Marianna Nagy, 82, Hungarian pair skater.
Patrick Roy, 53, French politician, pancreatic cancer.
Peter Urbach, 71, German Cold War informant.
Thanasis Veggos, 83, Greek actor, stroke.
Armand Van Wambeke, 84, Belgian Olympic basketball player.
Des Williams, 83, South African Olympic boxer.

4
James Beggs, 87, American Olympic rower.
Lázaro Blanco, 73, Mexican photographer, cancer.
Maurice Carpentier, 89, French cyclist.
Frans de Kok, 87, Dutch conductor.
Oliver Elmes, 76, British graphic designer (Doctor Who).
Jacques Georges Habib Hafouri, 94, Syrian Catholic hierarch, Archbishop of Hassaké-Nisibi (1982–1996).
Sammy McCrory, 86, Northern Irish footballer.
Ronald H. Miller, 73, American professor of religion.
Mary Murphy, 80, American actress (The Wild One).
Thomas G. Nelson, 74, American federal judge, complications from declining health.
Françoise Olivier-Coupeau, 51, French politician, cancer.
Emil Reinecke, 78, German cyclist.
Acacio Valbuena Rodríguez, 88, Spanish Roman Catholic prelate, Prefect for Western Sahara (1994–2009).
Frans Sammut, 66, Maltese writer, natural causes.
Bernard Stasi, 80, French politician, Minister for Overseas Departments and Territories (1973–1974), Alzheimer's disease.
Richard Steinheimer, 81, American railroad photographer, Alzheimer's disease. 
Sada Thompson, 83, American actress (Family), lung disease.

5
Leslie Audus, 99, British botany professor (University of London), expert on plant growth hormones.
Alice Bridges, 94, American Olympic bronze medal-winning (1936) swimmer.
Nikolay Chuchalov, 78, Soviet Olympic wrestler.
Claude Choules, 110, British-born Australian veteran, last combat veteran of World War I.
Donald Crump, 78, Canadian commissioner of the Canadian Football League (1990–1991).
Salomón Hakim, 81, Colombian neurosurgeon, researcher and inventor.
Al Johnson, 88, American football player and coach.
Arthur Laurents, 93, American playwright, librettist, stage director, and screenwriter (Anastasia, Rope, West Side Story).
Dougie McCracken, 46, Scottish football player (Ayr United), suspected suicide.
Yosef Merimovich, 86, Israeli football player and manager.
Rolo Puente, 71, Argentine actor, pulmonary emphysema.
Friedrich Rückert, 90, Austrian Olympic hockey player.
Tommy Wright, 83, Scottish footballer.
Dana Wynter, 79, German-born British actress (Invasion of the Body Snatchers, Airport, The Man Who Never Was), heart failure.

6
Barry Connolly, 72, Australian football player.
Oniroku Dan, 80, Japanese author, esophageal cancer.
Sir Geoffrey Dhenin, 93, British air marshal.
Bill Hopkins, 83, Welsh writer.
Horace Freeland Judson, 80, American science historian (The Great Betrayal: Fraud In Science), complications of a stroke.
Antanas Krištopaitis, 89, Lithuanian painter.
Kazi Nuruzzaman, 86, Bangladeshi veteran of the Liberation War, natural causes.
Duane Pillette, 88, American baseball player (New York Yankees, Philadelphia Phillies).
Dick Walsh, 85, American baseball executive, first commissioner of the North American Soccer League. 
Yoon Ki-Won, 24, South Korean football player, suicide by inhaling toxic fumes.

7
Johnny Albino, 93, Puerto Rican bolero singer, heart attack.
Seve Ballesteros, 54, Spanish golfer, brain cancer.
Big George, 53, British broadcaster and music arranger.
Willard Boyle, 86, Canadian physicist, Nobel laureate (2009).
Shaukat Galiev, 82, Soviet Tatar poet and writer of children's books.
Jack Gordon, 66, American politician, member of the Mississippi House of Representatives (1972–1980), State Senator (1980–1992; 1996–2011), brain cancer.
Ross Hagen, 72, American actor (Daktari, Speedway).
Allyson Hennessy, 63, Trinidadian broadcaster.
Eilert Määttä, 75, Swedish ice hockey player and coach.
Milan Mišík, 82, Slovak geologist.
Gunter Sachs, 78, German photographer, author and multi-millionaire industrialist, suicide by gunshot.
Robert Stempel, 77, American automobile executive, chairman and CEO of General Motors (1990–1992).
Kate Swift, 87, American writer, stomach cancer.
John Walker, 67, American musician (The Walker Brothers), liver cancer.
Doric Wilson, 72, American playwright and gay activist.

8
Paul Baker Jr., 90, American pilot and physicist.
Huthaifa al-Batawi, Iraqi al-Qaeda leader, shot.
Hans-Georg Borck, 89, German military officer.
Wallace Clark, 84, Northern Irish maritime writer.
Cornell Dupree, 68, American jazz and R&B guitarist, complications from emphysema.
George Guțiu, 87, Romanian Catholic hierarch, Archbishop of Cluj-Gherla (1994–2002).
Corwin Hansch, 92, American chemist, pneumonia.
Li Desheng, 95, Chinese People's Liberation Army general.
Charles McPhee, 49, American radio host, amyotrophic lateral sclerosis.
Greg Percival, 86, Australian politician, member of the New South Wales Legislative Council (1977–1978; 1986–1988).
Soňa Pertlová, 23, Czech chessplayer, cancer.
Lionel Rose, 62, Australian world champion boxer.
Hilton Rosemarin, 58, Canadian set decorator (Three Men and a Baby, Cocktail, Jumper), brain cancer.
Carlos Trillo, 68, Argentine comic book writer (Cybersix).
Galina Urbanovich, 93, Russian Olympic gold and silver medal-winning (1952) gymnast.
Arkady Vaksberg, 83, Soviet and Russian lawyer, author, film maker and playwright.
Sir Ronald Waterhouse, 85, British jurist.

9
George Allen, 87, American ichthyologist and fisheries scientist.
William Y. Anderson, 89, Swedish-born American fighter pilot.
David Cairns, 44, British politician, MP for Greenock and Inverclyde (2001–2005) and Inverclyde (since 2005), acute pancreatitis.
Robert Ellsworth, 84, American politician and diplomat, Representative from Kansas (1961–1967), Ambassador to NATO (1969–1971), complications from pneumonia.
Epiphanios of Vryoula, 76, American Greek Orthodox Archbishop of Spain and Portugal.
Henry Feffer, 93, American professor and spine surgeon, treated Saddam Hussein, heart failure.
Dolores Fuller, 88, American actress (Glen or Glenda), and songwriter ("Rock-A-Hula Baby").
Jeff Gralnick, 72, American television news producer.
*Lidia Gueiler Tejada, 89, Bolivian politician, acting President (1979–1980), after a long illness.
Doug Leeds, 63, American executive, vice-chairman of American Theatre Wing, cancer.
Ivo Pešák, 66, Czech singer, dancer and comic performer.
Roland Spångberg, 88, Swedish Olympic water polo player.
Newton Thornburg, 81, American novelist.
Shailendra Kumar Upadhyaya, 82, Nepali politician, Foreign Minister (1986–1990), altitude sickness. 
Wouter Weylandt, 26, Belgian road bicycle racer, race crash.

10
Omar Ahmad, 46, American entrepreneur (Napster) and politician, Mayor of San Carlos, California (2010–2011), heart attack.
Michael Baze, 24, American jockey, accidental drug overdose.
Bill Bergesch, 89, American baseball executive (Kansas City Athletics, New York Yankees, Cincinnati Reds).
Frank Boston, 72, American politician, member of the Maryland House of Delegates (1987–1999).
John S. Carter, 65, American music producer, cancer.
Bill Gallo, 88, American cartoonist and newspaper columnist, complications from pneumonia.
Patrick Galvin, 83, Irish writer.
Zim Ngqawana, 51, South African jazz saxophonist, stroke.
Burt Reinhardt, 91, American broadcast executive, President of CNN (1982–1990), complications from strokes.
David Weston, 75, British artist.
Norma Zimmer, 87, American entertainer (The Lawrence Welk Show).

11
Clark Accord, 50, Surinamese–Dutch author and makeup artist, stomach cancer.
Maurice Goldhaber, 100, American physicist.
Leo Kahn, 94, American entrepreneur, co-founder of Staples, complications from a series of strokes.
Albert Kanene Obiefuna, 81, Nigerian Roman Catholic prelate, Archbishop of Onitsha (1995–2003).
Leo Passage, 75, Dutch-born American hairstylist.
Reach Sambath, 47, Cambodian journalist, stroke.
Elisabeth Svendsen, 81, British hotelier and animal welfare campaigner, founder of The Donkey Sanctuary.
Robert Traylor, 34, American basketball player (Milwaukee Bucks, Cleveland Cavaliers, New Orleans Hornets), suspected heart attack.
Glyn Williams, 92, Welsh footballer.
Snooky Young, 92, American jazz trumpeter, complications of a lung ailment.

12
Chen Muhua, 90, Chinese politician.
Harrison Chongo, 41, Zambian football player, malaria.
Charles F. Haas, 97, American television director (Bonanza, The Outer Limits, The Man from U.N.C.L.E.).
Mose Jefferson, 68, American businessman, cancer.
Jack Jones, 86, American Pulitzer Prize-winning reporter (Los Angeles Times), lung disease.
Lloyd Knibb, 80, Jamaican drummer (The Skatalites), liver cancer.
Noreen Murray, 76, British geneticist.
David Orton, 77, Canadian environmentalist, pancreatic cancer.
Carlos Pascual, 80, Cuban baseball player (Washington Senators).
Luigi del Gallo Roccagiovine, 88, Italian nobleman and Roman Catholic prelate, Titular Bishop of Camplum (since 1982).
Ron Springs, 54, American football player (Dallas Cowboys, Tampa Bay Buccaneers), complications from surgery. 
Bill Summers, 75, American car builder (Goldenrod).
Miyu Uehara, 24, Japanese glamour model, apparent suicide by hanging.
Jack Wolf, 76, American information theorist, cancer.

13
Derek Boogaard, 28, Canadian hockey player (Minnesota Wild, New York Rangers), accidental overdose of alcohol and oxycodone.
Stephen De Staebler, 78, American sculptor and printmaker, complications from cancer.
Pam Gems, 85, British playwright.
Bernard Greenhouse, 95, American cellist.
Bob Litherland, 80, British politician, MP for Manchester Central (1979–1997), cancer.
Princess Maria Elisabeth of Bavaria, 96, German noblewoman.
Wallace McCain, 81, Canadian businessman, co-founder of McCain Foods, pancreatic cancer.
Mel Queen, 69, American baseball player (Cincinnati Reds, Los Angeles Angels of Anaheim) and pitching coach (Blue Jays).
Jack Richardson, 81, Canadian record producer (The Guess Who).
Bruce Ricker, 68, American film documentarian and producer (Thelonious Monk: Straight, No Chaser).
Badal Sarkar, 85, Indian dramatist, colon cancer.
Chit Estella, 53, Filipino journalist and professor, traffic collision.

14
Ferial Alibali, 78, Albanian actress.
James Richard Cheek, 74, American diplomat, Ambassador to Sudan (1989–1992) and Argentina (1993–1996).
Murray Handwerker, 89, American businessman (Nathan's Famous).
Teuvo Laukkanen, 91, Finnish Olympic silver medal-winning (1948) cross-country skier.
Michael Onslow, 7th Earl of Onslow, 73, British politician.
Nicholas V. Riasanovsky, 87, Chinese-born American historian and author.
Birgitta Trotzig, 81, Swedish author.
Ernie Walker, 82, Scottish football administrator.
Joseph Wershba, 90, American television producer and reporter.

15
Gunnar Alksnis, 79, Latvian-American philosopher and theologian.
Maico Buncio, 22, Filipino motorcycle racer, race crash.
Donald Christian, 52, Antiguan Olympic cyclist.
John Feikens, 93, American senior (former chief) judge of the District Court for the Eastern District of Michigan, after long illness.
Bob Flanigan, 84, American singer (The Four Freshmen) and musician.
Pete Lovely, 85, American racecar driver.
William Pennington, 88, American casino executive (Circus Circus Enterprises), Parkinson's disease.
Anjuman Shehzadi, 33, Pakistani sage actress.
Mahendra Singh Tikait, 76, Indian farming union leader, bone cancer.
Samuel Wanjiru, 24, Kenyan Olympic gold medal-winning (2008) marathon runner, fall from balcony.
Martin Woodhouse, 78, British novelist, screenwriter and inventor.

16
Ralph Barker, 93, British air gunner and writer.
Robert Berks, 89, American sculptor, industrial designer and planner.
Douglas Blubaugh, 76, American Olympic gold medal-winning (1960) wrestler, motorcycle accident.
Serghei Covaliov, 66, Romanian Olympic gold (1968) and silver (1972) medal-winning canoeist.
Bob Davis, 82, Australian football player.
Nathaniel Davis, 86, American diplomat, cancer.
Edward Hardwicke, 78, British actor (Sherlock Holmes), son of Sir Cedric Hardwicke.
Kiyoshi Kodama, 77, Japanese actor, stomach cancer.
Bill Skiles, 79, American comedian (Skiles and Henderson), kidney cancer.

17
Sean Dunphy, 73, Irish entertainer.
Joseph Galibardy, 96, Indian Olympic gold medal-winning (1936) field hockey player.
James M. Hewgley, Jr., 94, American politician, Mayor of Tulsa, Oklahoma (1966–1970).
Harmon Killebrew, 74, American Hall of Fame baseball player (Minnesota Twins, Kansas City Royals), esophageal cancer.
Tómas Mac Anna, 84, Irish director and actor.
Frank Upton, 76, English footballer (Derby County, Chelsea), after short illness.

18
Seiseki Abe, 96, Japanese shodo and aikido teacher.
Marcel De Mulder, 83, Belgian cyclist.
Edward H. Harte, 88, American newspaper executive (Harte-Hanks).
Leonard Kastle, 82, American composer and filmmaker (The Honeymoon Killers).
Wlodzimierz Ksiazek, 60, Polish-born American painter. (body found on this date)
Hans Sterr, 77, German Olympic wrestler.
Antoinette Tubman, 97, Liberian socialite, First Lady (1948–1971).
Dick Wimmer, 74, American author, heart complications.

19
Phyllis Avery, 88, American actress, heart failure.
Don H. Barden, 67, American businessman, lung cancer.
Garret FitzGerald, 85, Irish politician, Taoiseach (1981–1982, 1982–1987), Minister for Foreign Affairs (1973–1977), pneumonia.
Ivan Gibbs, 83, Australian politician, Queensland MLA for Albert (1974–1989), cancer.
Jeffrey Catherine Jones, 67, American transgender artist.
David H. Kelley, 87, American-born Canadian archaeologist.
Kathy Kirby, 72, British singer, heart attack.
William Kloefkorn, 78, American poet.
Alda Noni, 95, Italian coloratura soprano.
Vladimir Ryzhkin, 80, Russian Olympic gold medal-winning (1956) footballer.
Tom West, 71, American computer hardware engineer, heart attack.

20
Michael Bell, 74, Irish politician, Teachta Dála for Louth (1982–2002).
John Cigna, 75, American radio personality (KDKA).
William Elliott, Baron Elliott of Morpeth, 90, British politician, MP for Newcastle upon Tyne North (1957–1983).
Arieh Handler, 95, Israeli Zionist leader.
Eduard Janota, 59, Czech politician, Finance Minister (2009–2010), cardiac arrest.
Donald Krim, 65, American businessman, president of Kino International, cancer.
Ciril Pelhan, 89, Yugoslav Olympic swimmer.
Joaquín Pérez, 75, Mexican Olympic double bronze medal-winning (1980) equestrian.
Steve Rutt, 66, American inventor of early video animation, pancreatic cancer.
Randy Savage, 58, American professional wrestler (WWF, WCW) and actor (Spider-Man), heart attack.

21
John Delaney, 42, Irish businessman (Intrade).
Irene Gilbert, 76, American actress and school director, co-founder of Stella Adler Academy of Los Angeles, Alzheimer's disease.
David J. Hudson, 67, American sound mixer (Beauty and the Beast, The Terminator, The Lion King).
Bill Hunter, 71, Australian actor (Muriel's Wedding), liver cancer.
Pádraig Kennelly, 82, Irish website, editor and journalist, founder of Kerry's Eye.
Dieter Klöcker, 75, German clarinetist.
Gordon McLennan, 87, British politician, General Secretary of the Communist Party (1975–1990), cancer.
Hiroyuki Nagato, 77, Japanese actor, cerebrovascular disease.
Jim Pyburn, 78, American baseball player (Baltimore Orioles), after long illness. 
Bill Rechin, 80, American cartoonist (Crock), complications from esophageal cancer.
William White, 98, British sports shooter.

22
Stanislav Batishchev, 70, Soviet Ukrainian weightlifter.
Joseph Brooks, 73, American Grammy-winning songwriter ("You Light Up My Life"), suicide by asphyxiation.
Joëlle Brupbacher, 32, Swiss mountaineer, acute mountain sickness.
Chidananda Dasgupta, 89, Indian film critic.
Bill Eaton, 79, Australian politician, member of the Queensland Legislative Assembly for Mourilyan (1980–1994).
Alexandru Ene, 82, Romanian football player.
Matej Ferjan, 34, Slovenian motorcycle speedway rider.
Bob Gould, 74, Australian activist and bookseller.
Ralph Hunt, 83, Australian politician, MP for Gwydir (1969–1989).
Suzanne Mizzi, 43, British glamour model and interior designer, cancer.
Ronald Naar, 56, Dutch mountaineer.
Breon O'Casey, 83, British artist.
Govind Chandra Pande, 87, Indian historian.
Walter Soboleff, 102, American Tlingit scholar and spiritual leader, first Native Alaskan Prebysterian minister, bone and prostate cancer.
Joe Steffy, 85, American college football player (Army), 1947 Outland Trophy winner.
George Henry Strohsahl, Jr., 73, American naval officer and former commander of the Pacific Missile Test Center.

23
Sam Faust, 26, Australian rugby league player, leukemia.
Michele Fawdon, 63, British-born Australian actress (Cathy's Child), cancer.
Peter Frelinghuysen, Jr., 95, American politician, U.S. Representative from New Jersey (1953–1975).
Nasser Hejazi, 61, Iranian football player and manager, cancer.
Pilu Momtaz, 52, Bangladeshi pop singer.
Abdias do Nascimento, 97, Brazilian activist and politician.
*Joseph Nguyên Tich Duc, 73, Vietnamese Roman Catholic prelate, Bishop of Ban Me Thuot (2000–2006).
Karel Otčenášek, 91, Czech Roman Catholic prelate, Bishop of Hradec Králové (1989–1998).
Frank S. Petersen, 88, American jurist and politician.
Harry Redmond, Jr., 101, American special effects artist and producer (King Kong), natural causes.
Alejandro Roces, 86, Filipino writer and government official, Secretary of Education (1961–1965).
Roberto Sosa, 81, Honduran poet, heart attack.
John Templeton-Cotill, 90, British admiral.
Xavier Tondo, 32, Spanish cyclist, crushed by car.

24
Huguette Clark, 104, American heiress, daughter of William A. Clark.
José Cláudio Ribeiro da Silva, 54, Brazilian Amazon environmentalist and conservationist, shot.
Arthur Goldreich, 82, South African-born Israeli political activist.
Mark Haines, 65, American television anchor (CNBC).
Imre Nagy, 70, Canadian Olympic fencer.
Edward Plunkett, 20th Baron of Dunsany, 71, Irish artist.
Barry Potomski, 38, Canadian ice hockey player (Los Angeles Kings).
Sir Blair Stewart-Wilson, 81, British courtier.
Paul Winslow, 82, South African cricketer.
Stephen K. Yamashiro, 69, American politician, Mayor of Hawaii County (1992–2000), pneumonia. 
Hakim Ali Zardari, 81, Pakistani politician, father of Asif Ali Zardari, after long illness.

25
Lillian Adams, 89, American actress (The Suite Life on Deck, Bruce Almighty).
Maurice E. Baringer, 89, American educator and politician.
Werner Freiherr von Beschwitz, 96, German military officer in World War II, Iron Cross recipient.
Nina Leopold Bradley, 93, American conservationist.
Leonora Carrington, 94, British-born Mexican painter and novelist.
Luigi Diligenza, 90, Italian Roman Catholic prelate, Archbishop of Capua (1978–1997).
Roger Gautier, 88, French Olympic silver medal-winning (1952) rower.
Edwin Honig, 91, American poet and translator, Alzheimer's disease.
Terry Jenner, 66, Australian Test cricketer and coach.
Miroslav Opsenica, 29, Serbian footballer, car accident.
Gene Smith, 94, American baseball player (Negro leagues).
Paul Splittorff, 64, American baseball player and broadcaster (Kansas City Royals), complications from melanoma.
Dimitrios Taliadoros, 85/86, Greek Olympic basketball player.
Yannis Varveris, 56, Greek poet, critic and translator, cardiac arrest.
Paul J. Wiedorfer, 90, American soldier, Medal of Honor recipient.
Edward Żentara, 55, Polish actor.

26
Arisen Ahubudu, 91, Sri Lankan scholar, author and playwright.
Flick Colby, 65, American dancer and choreographer (Pan's People), bronchial pneumonia.
George Heron, 92, American tribal leader, President of the Seneca Nation of New York (1958–1960; 1962–1964).
Irwin D. Mandel, 89, American dental scientist in preventative dentistry.
Peter McKechnie, 70, Australian politician, member of the Queensland Legislative Assembly for Carnarvon (1974–1989).
Tyler Simpson, 25, Australian soccer player.

27
Sam Alexander, 28, British Royal Marine, shot.
María Rosa Alonso, 104, Spanish professor, philologist and essayist.
Edward a'Beckett, 71, Australian cricketer.
Armando Bandini, 84, Italian actor and voice actor.
John W. Bowen, 84, American politician, Member of the Ohio Senate.
Johnny Brewer, 74, American football player (Cleveland Browns, New Orleans Saints).
Janet Brown, 87, British actress and impersonator, after short illness.
Jeff Conaway, 60, American actor (Grease, Taxi, Babylon 5).
Margo Dydek, 37, Polish basketball player (Utah Starzz, Los Angeles Sparks) and coach, heart attack.
Johanna Fiedler, 65, American author, daughter of Arthur Fiedler.
Regalado Maambong, 72, Filipino jurist, member of 1986 Constitutional Commission.
Prince Ali Mirza Qajar, 81, Iranian royal, Head of the Qajar Imperial Family (since 1988), after long illness.
Joaquín Moya, 79, Spanish Olympic fencer.
Gil Scott-Heron, 62, American poet, musician and author.
Jukka Toivola, 61, Finnish Olympic athlete, amyotrophic lateral sclerosis.
Michael Willoughby, 12th Baron Middleton, 90, British aristocrat and politician.

28
Hermann Bley, 75, German footballer.
Mohammed Daud Daud, 42, Afghan general, police commander for northern Afghanistan, bombing.
Bill Harris, 79, Canadian baseball player (Brooklyn/Los Angeles Dodgers).
Romuald Klim, 78, Belarusian hammer thrower, Olympic gold medalist (1964).
Ann McPherson, 65, British physician and public health campaigner.
Dame Barbara Mills, 70, British barrister, Director of Public Prosecutions (1992–1998), stroke.
Leo Rangell, 97, American psychoanalyst, complications from surgery. 
Alys Robi, 88, Canadian singer.
Martha Rommelaere, 88, Canadian baseball player (All-American Girls Professional Baseball League). 
John H. Sinfelt, 80, American chemical engineer in unleaded gasoline, congestive heart failure.

29
Sergei Bagapsh, 62, Abkhazian politician, President (since 2005), complications after surgery.
Jon Blake, 52, Australian actor, pneumonia.
Simon Brint, 60, British musician, suicide.
Bill Clements, 94, American politician, Governor of Texas (1979–1983; 1987–1991).
Billy Crook, 84, English footballer (Wolverhampton Wanderers).
Wally Jay, 93, American martial arts teacher, founder of Small Circle JuJitsu, after long illness.
Ferenc Mádl, 80, Hungarian politician, President of the Republic (2000–2005).
Vitaly Margulis, 83, Russian classical pianist.
Tom Roeser, 82, American political commentator.
Bill Roycroft, 96, Australian equestrian, five-time Olympian, gold medallist (1960).
Cosmo Francesco Ruppi, 78, Italian Roman Catholic prelate, Bishop of Termoli-Larino (1980–1988) and Archbishop of Lecce (1988–2009).

30
Bill Benulis, 82, American cartoonist.
Ricky Bruch, 64, Swedish athlete, cancer.
Henri Chammartin, 92, Swiss dressage equestrian, multiple Olympic medallist.
Paul B. Ferrara, 68, American scientist and administrator, pioneer of genetic fingerprinting, brain tumor.
Jung Jong-kwan, 29, South Korean footballer, suspected suicide by hanging.
Sudhakar Kulkarni, 73, Indian cricket umpire.
Eddie Morrison, 63, Scottish footballer and manager (Kilmarnock). 
Hans Nogler, 91, Austrian Olympic alpine skier.
Isikia Savua, 59, Fijian diplomat and police commissioner. 
Marek Siemek, 68, Polish philosopher and historian of philosophy.
Clarice Taylor, 93, American actress (Sesame Street, The Cosby Show).
Giorgio Tozzi, 88, American operatic bass, heart attack.
Tillmann Uhrmacher, 44, German DJ, music producer and radio host.
Rosalyn Sussman Yalow, 89, American medical physicist, Nobel laureate.

31
Gilberto Aleman, 80, Spanish author and journalist.
Pauline Betz, 91, American tennis player.
Jonas Bevacqua, 33, American fashion designer (Lifted Research Group).
Conrado Estrella, Sr., 93, Filipino politician, Governor of Pangasinan (1954–1963), Agrarian Reform Minister (1978–1986).
Derek Hodge, 69, U.S. Virgin Islander politician and attorney, Lieutenant Governor of the United States Virgin Islands (1987–1995), cancer.
Keith Irvine, 82, British-born American interior designer, cardiac arrest.
Hans Keilson, 101, German-born Dutch psychoanalyst and novelist.
Sir John Martin, 93, British admiral, Lieutenant Governor of Guernsey (1974–1980).
Adolfas Mekas, 85, Lithuanian-born American film director.
Andy Robustelli, 85, American Hall of Fame football player (Los Angeles Rams, New York Giants).
Philip Rose, 89, American theatrical producer, stroke.
Ezzatollah Sahabi, 81, Iranian politician, Member of Parliament (1980–1984), stroke.
Saleem Shahzad, 40, Pakistani journalist, shot. (body found on this date)
Hugh Stewart, 100, British film editor and producer.
Grant Sullivan, 86, American actor (Pony Express), cancer.
Ram Man Trishit, 70, Nepali lyricist, kidney problems.
Sølvi Wang, 81, Norwegian singer and actress.
Jennifer Worth, 75, British author, esophageal cancer.

References

2011-05
 05